General elections were held in Islamabad Capital Territory on Monday
18 February 2008 to elect 2 member of National Assembly of Pakistan from Islamabad.

Pakistan Muslim League (N) won both seats from Islamabad with comfortable margin.

Candidates 
Total no of 34 Candidates including 19 Independents contested for 2 National Assembly Seats from Islamabad.

Result 

Party Wise

Constituency wise

References 

2008 elections in Pakistan
General elections in Pakistan